The 1995–96 Wichita Thunder season was the fourth season of the CHL franchise in Wichita, Kansas.

Regular season

League standings

Note: y - clinched league title; x - clinched playoff spot; e - eliminated from playoff contention

See also
1995–96 CHL season

External links
1995–96 Wichita Thunder season at Hockey Database

Wichita Thunder seasons
Wich